The enzyme 2-dehydro-3-deoxy-6-phosphogalactonate aldolase catalyzes the chemical reaction

2-dehydro-3-deoxy-D-galactonate 6-phosphate  pyruvate + D-glyceraldehyde 3-phosphate

This enzyme belongs to the family of lyases, specifically the aldehyde-lyases, which cleave carbon-carbon bonds.  The systematic name of this enzyme class is 2-dehydro-3-deoxy-D-galactonate-6-phosphate D-glyceraldehyde-3-phosphate-lyase (pyruvate-forming). Other names in common use include 6-phospho-2-keto-3-deoxygalactonate aldolase, phospho-2-keto-3-deoxygalactonate aldolase, 2-keto-3-deoxy-6-phosphogalactonic aldolase, phospho-2-keto-3-deoxygalactonic aldolase, 2-keto-3-deoxy-6-phosphogalactonic acid aldolase, (KDPGal)aldolase, 2-dehydro-3-deoxy-D-galactonate-6-phosphate, and D-glyceraldehyde-3-phosphate-lyase.  This enzyme participates in galactose metabolism.

Structural studies

References 

 

EC 4.1.2
Enzymes of known structure